Giancarlo Bellini (born 15 September 1945 in Crosa) is an Italian former road bicycle racer who won the mountains classification in the 1976 Tour de France. He also won a stage in the 1978 Giro d'Italia.

References

External links

1945 births
Living people
Italian male cyclists
Italian Giro d'Italia stage winners
Sportspeople from the Province of Biella
Tour de Suisse stage winners
Cyclists from Piedmont